Alan Leonard Rachins (born October 3, 1942) is an American television actor, known for his role as Douglas Brackman in L.A. Law which earned him both Golden Globe and Emmy nominations, and his portrayal of Larry (Dharma's hippie father) on the television series Dharma & Greg.

Career
Rachins graduated from Brookline High School. He enrolled at the Wharton School of the University of Pennsylvania, ultimately dropping out, but managed to graduate from Empire State College in 1974.

He moved to New York to study acting. Over the next decade, he performed in a succession of plays, including the original Broadway productions of After the Rain and H'adrian the Seventh, as well as the original off-Broadway productions of The Trojan Women and the controversial Oh! Calcutta!

In 1972, Rachins put his acting career on hold when he was accepted as a fellow in the writing and directing programs at the American Film Institute. He went on to sell scripts to a variety of shows, including The Fall Guy, Hill Street Blues, Knight Rider, Quincy, and Hart To Hart.

Despite these successes as a writer and director, Rachins returned to his acting career with a leading role in Henry Jaglom’s independent film, Always. This critically acclaimed film brought him widespread attention and ultimately led to his role on L.A. Law. He continued working in feature films, and provided the voice for the Clock King in two episodes of Batman: The Animated Series, and later in one episode of Justice League Unlimited.

Recent theatre appearances include the world premiere of Arthur Laurents' Attacks Of The Heart at the George Street Playhouse in New Brunswick, New Jersey. At the Cape Playhouse, he played the part of Matthew Harrison Brady in Inherit The Wind. He tackled the role of "Albin" in La Cage Aux Folles at the Jupiter Theater, was seen in Love Letters with Swoosie Kurtz at Beverly Hills' Coronet Theatre, and starred in a revival of Promises, Promises with Jason Alexander, Jean Smart and Alan Thicke at L.A.'s Freud Theatre.

Rachins appeared on the ABC-TV series Eli Stone, playing an attorney in consultation with Eli Stone. The name "Brackman" can be seen in inverted letters on a translucent wall behind Rachins. For two seasons, he provided the voice of Norman Osborn on the cartoon series The Spectacular Spider-Man. He also appeared on the TNT TV series Rizzoli & Isles as a recurring guest star, and guest starred as Frank (Bob's father, and Gabe, PJ and Teddy's granddad) in the Good Luck Charlie episode "It's a Charlie Duncan Thanksgiving".

Personal life
Rachins was born in 1942 in Cambridge, Massachusetts, to a Jewish family, the son of Edward and Ida Rachins. His father was in a family food manufacturing business called Snow Crest.

Rachins and actress Joanna Frank have been married since 1978 and have a son. The couple has formed the production company Allofit Productions which has acquired books and original screenplays to develop for television and feature films. Rachins is a member of Mensa.

Filmography

Film

Television

References

External links

AlanRachins.com - Official website

1942 births
Living people
20th-century American male actors
21st-century American male actors
American male film actors
American male television actors
American male voice actors
Empire State College alumni
Jewish American male actors
Male actors from Cambridge, Massachusetts
Mensans
Writers from Cambridge, Massachusetts
Wharton School of the University of Pennsylvania alumni
Brookline High School alumni
21st-century American Jews